Porto–Lisbon (Portuguese: Porto–Lisboa) was an annual road cycling race held in Portugal on 10 June in celebration of Portugal Day. Covering a distance of approximately 330-340 kilometres, the race was the longest on the professional calendar after the disappearance of Bordeaux–Paris in 1988. It started in Porto, Portugal's second-largest city, and finished in the Portuguese capital Lisbon around eight or nine hours later.

Although it was the most important classic in Portugal, in its later days it was usually only contested by Portuguese cycling teams. In 2002 Porto–Lisbon was held as a team-race divided in three sectors between Porto and Lisboa. In 2004 the last edition of the race was held. Since its cancellation, Milan–San Remo is the longest one-day race of the year, at approximately 298 km.

Winners

* The 1982 "Porto–Lisboa" de 1982 was interrupted in Alcobaça (due to protest from the local population), and the winner of the section "Porto–Coimbra" was considered the overall winner.

References

Recurring sporting events established in 1911
Recurring sporting events disestablished in 2004
Cycle races in Portugal
Defunct cycling races in Portugal
Men's road bicycle races
1911 establishments in Portugal
2004 disestablishments in Portugal
Defunct sports competitions in Portugal